Eugenijus Kazimieras Jovaiša (born 17 January 1940 in Rokiškis) is a Lithuanian fashion artist.

Biography 
In 1965, she graduated from the Estonian Academy of Arts, where she was a student of, Eric Adamsons. In 1965–2004, she was a professor at the Kaunas S. Zukas College of Applied Arts (1989, Kaunas Higher School of Art, 2001 from Kaunas College). She is a member of the Lithuanian Artists' Association.

Works 
Creator monumental interiors leather panels: Herbal pharmacy in Kaunas 1970, Kaunas City Map of Kaunas City Executive Committee (1978, now Kaunas city municipality), resting at home "Flax" in Palanga (36 screens), children's music school in Panevėžys 1988 m . and others.

Since 1991 decorative panels designed leather interiors for private ("Verses" in 1993, "The Last Supper" in 1995, both in Kaunas, Mindaugas coronation. "Hunting," "Tree," "Sacrifice", all in 1998, "Fish," "Wile," both in 2000, all Florida United States).

Works characterized by stylized figurative expressions, plant, heraldic reasons, IV. terrain, engaging, tanned, burned, auksuotos skin technique, using a font. Since 1968 participate in exhibitions.

See also 
 List of Lithuanian painters

References

External links 
 "Eugenijus Kazimieras Jovaiša", Lithuanian Wikipedia

Lithuanian painters
1940 births
Living people